Submarine 1922 a submarine volcano was found in 1922 after a series of underwater earthquakes that started in 1912, in the Sangihe Islands of Indonesia.

See also 

 List of volcanoes in Indonesia

References 

Active volcanoes
Submarine volcanoes of Indonesia
Seamounts of the Celebes Sea